Thomas Hill Watts Sr. (January 3, 1819September 16, 1892) was the 18th Governor of the U.S. state of Alabama from 1863 to 1865, during the Civil War.

Early life
Watts was born at Pine Flat in the Alabama Territory on January 3, 1819, the oldest of twelve children born to John Hughes Watts and Prudence Hill, who had moved from Georgia to find the better lands of the frontier. He was of English and Welsh ancestry. Prepared for college at the Airy Mount Academy in Dallas County, Watts graduated with honors from the University of Virginia in 1840. The next year, he passed the bar examination and began practicing law in Greenville. In 1848 he moved his lucrative law practice to Montgomery. He also became a successful planter, enslaving 179 people in 1860.

Political career
Politically, Watts adopted a pro-Union stance during the 1850s. Still, on the eve of the Civil War, he played an important role in the declared secession of Alabama and was one of the signers of the secession ordinance. Defeated by John Gill Shorter in an 1861 bid for governor, Watts organized the 17th Regiment Alabama Infantry and led it at Pensacola and Corinth, but resigned as its colonel to become the Confederacy's attorney general in President Jefferson Davis' cabinet.

Governor of Alabama
In 1863 Watts was elected Governor of Alabama. Assuming office on December 1, he began an eighteen-month governorship when impressment, tax-in-kind, and other severe wartime economic measures had become most odious. Worthless Confederate money, lack of credit possibilities, irregular supplies of goods, impressment efforts that often amounted to pillage and plunder, and harsh (and unevenly applied) taxes-in-kind levied on agriculture convinced many people that they preferred the "Old Union" to the "new despotism".

The desire to raise troops for the Confederate States Army became more urgent. There was insurmountable resistance to appeals to the male population to form volunteer companies and appeals to the state legislature to reorganize the awkward two-class militia. Some critics of Watts thought he should concentrate on forcing deserters back into military service. The legislature's failure to act meant that the state, and the Confederacy, would not have an effective militia in the final critical months of the war. Furthermore, the Confederate Conscription Act of February 17, 1864, inaugurated a policy of conscription that inevitably led to conflict between the state and the Confederacy.

By September 1864, another turbulent issue confronted Governor Watts: the opening negotiations for peace. A faction in the Alabama House of Representatives introduced resolutions in favor of the negotiations. Governor Watts was also faced with rising desertion rates, states' rights issues, including the controversy over the conscription of the cadets at the University of Alabama, the issue of which state civil officials were exempt from conscription, the defense of Mobile, blockade-running, and cotton trading with Europe.

During the winter of 1864–65, Governor Watts had to deal with the increasing number of sacrifices demanded of his state, the breakdown of authority, the drain on war power, and an evaporating hope of victory, all of which contributed to the state's war-weariness. Governor Watts was aware of his ineffectiveness and unpopularity by this time and made no effort toward re-election, although he continued to talk optimistically about the military situation. Watts was arrested for treason to the union in Union Springs, Alabama, on May 1, 1865. He was released a few weeks later and returned to Montgomery.

He died twenty-seven years later, on September 16, 1892, in Montgomery, Alabama.

Family
On January 10, 1842, he wed Eliza Brown Allen, and they had ten children.

Watts was the great-great-grandfather of white nationalist Dr. William Luther Pierce.

References

Further reading
McMillan, Malcolm C. The Disintegration of a Confederate State, Three Governors and Alabama's Wartime Home Front, 1861–1865. Macon, Ga.: Mercer, 1986.

External links

Alabama Governors: Thomas Hill Watts

1819 births
1892 deaths
Alabama Secession Delegates of 1861
American people of English descent
American people of Welsh descent
American planters
Executive members of the Cabinet of the Confederate States of America
19th-century American politicians
People of Alabama in the American Civil War
Democratic Party governors of Alabama
People from Butler County, Alabama
Confederate States of America state governors
American slave owners